Artem Kasyanov (born 20 April 1983) is a Ukrainian footballer who most recently played as a midfielder for FC Okzhetpes in the Kazakhstan Premier League.

Career
He moved to Kharkiv from Metalurh Donetsk during the 2008 summer transfer season. On 9 July 2009 he signed a two-year contract with Chornomorets Odessa.

On 8 June 2016, Kasyanov signed for Zhetysu.

Kasyanov played for FC Okzhetpes in the 2018 season and left the club after that season.

References

External links
 FC Kharkiv Official Website Profile
 
 

1983 births
Living people
People from Stakhanov, Ukraine
Ukrainian footballers
Ukraine under-21 international footballers
Ukrainian Premier League players
Kazakhstan Premier League players
FC Stal Alchevsk players
FC Stal-2 Alchevsk players
FC Metalurh Donetsk players
FC Kharkiv players
FC Chornomorets Odesa players
FC Ordabasy players
Ukrainian expatriate footballers
Expatriate footballers in Kazakhstan
FC Metalist Kharkiv players
Ukrainian expatriate sportspeople in Kazakhstan
FC Zhetysu players
FC Altai Semey players
FC Viktoriya Mykolaivka players
Association football midfielders
Sportspeople from Luhansk Oblast